The Switzerland women's national basketball team represents Switzerland in international women's basketball competitions.

Switzerland was one of the five founding members of the Eurobasket in 1938. In 1953 it also took part in the World Cup's inaugural edition. However, the 1956 EuroBasket marked its last appearance in a final stage to date.

In the 2013 Eurobasket's qualification stage Switzerland faced Poland, Montenegro, Serbia and Estonia. The team achieved two victories, but did not qualify for the final stages there.

Head coaches
1980–1984: Milenko Tomić 
1984-1990: Željko Milković
1990-2017: Milenko Tomić

Current roster

See also
 Switzerland women's national under-19 basketball team
 Switzerland women's national under-17 basketball team
 Switzerland women's national 3x3 team

References

External links
 Official Website 
 FIBA profile
 Archived records of Switzerland team participations

 
Women's national basketball teams
 
national